Key Memorial Chapel, formerly the Roman Catholic parish church of Saint Philip the Apostle, is a historic Roman Catholic chapel located at 150 E. Sharpe Street in Statesville, Iredell County, North Carolina.  It is considered within the Roman Catholic Diocese of Charlotte.  It was built in 1898, and is a small one-story, two bay by four bay, Late Gothic Revival style brick building.  It features a large, pointed arch stained glass window and a two-story tower with crenellated parapet.  It was abandoned by 1976 when the parish was moved to its current location in Statesville, and the chapel was adaptively reused as a law office.

It was added to the National Register of Historic Places in 1980.

References

External links
Roman Catholic Diocese of Charlotte
 

Roman Catholic churches completed in 1898
Roman Catholic churches in North Carolina
Roman Catholic chapels in the United States
Roman Catholic Diocese of Charlotte
Churches on the National Register of Historic Places in North Carolina
Gothic Revival church buildings in North Carolina
Churches in Iredell County, North Carolina
National Register of Historic Places in Iredell County, North Carolina
1898 establishments in North Carolina
19th-century Roman Catholic church buildings in the United States